Octave is a given name. Notable people with the name include:

 Octave Boudouard (1872–1923), French chemist
 Octave Chanute (1832–1910), French-born American railway engineer and aviation pioneer
 Octave Crouzon (1874–1938), French neurologist
 Octave Dayen (1906–1987), French cyclist
 Octave Dua (1882–1952), Belgian operatic tenor
 Octave Duboscq (1868–1943), French zoologist, mycologist and parasitologist
 Octave Féré (1815–1875), French writer
 Octave Fortin (1842–1927), Canadian clergyman
 Octave Garnier (1889–1912), French anarchist and founding member of the infamous Bonnot Gang
 Octave Gengou (1875–1957), Belgian bacteriologist
 Octave Gréard (1828–1904), French educator
 Octave Lapize (1887–1917), French cyclist
 Octave Lebesgue (1857–1933), French journalist and writer
 Octave Levenspiel (1926–2017), American professor of chemical engineering
 Octave Lignier (1855–1916), French botanist
 Octave Mannoni (1899–1989), French psychoanalyst and author
 Octave Maus (1856–1919), Belgian art critic, writer, and lawyer
 Octave Merlier (1897–1996), French linguist of Greek
 Octave Mirbeau (1848–1917), French journalist
 Octave Penguilly L'Haridon (1811–1872), French painter
 Octave Pirmez (1832–1883), Belgian author born in Châtelineau
 Octave Pradels (1842–1930), French poet, novelist, vaudevilliste and lyricist
 Octave Tassaert (1800–1874), French painter
 Octave Terrillon (1844–1895), French physician and surgeon
 Octave Uzanne (1851–1931),  French bibliophile, writer, publisher, and journalist

See also
Octave (disambiguation)#People